Phillips County is a county located in the eastern part of the U.S. state of Arkansas, in what is known as the Arkansas Delta along the Mississippi River. As of the 2020 census, the population was 16,568. The county seat is Helena–West Helena.  

Phillips County is Arkansas's seventh (7th) county, formed on May 1, 1820. It was named for Sylvanus Phillips, the area's first-known white or European-American settler; he was elected as representative to the first Territorial Legislature of the Arkansas Territory. This fertile lowland area was developed for cotton plantations in the antebellum area and is still largely rural and agricultural.

The Helena-West Helena, AR Micropolitan Statistical Area includes all of Phillips County. From September 30-October 1, 1919 during the Elaine race riot in Phillips County, at least 237 African Americans were killed, attacked at large by armed whites trying to suppress the Progressive Farmers and Household Union of America which was organizing in the county. Because the white mob actions were racial terrorism against African Americans, the deaths were classified as lynchings by the Equal Justice Initiative in its 2015 report on lynchings in the South. Based on this, Phillips County ranks as the county with the highest number of lynchings in U.S. history.

Geography

Major highways
 U.S. Highway 49
 Highway 1
 Highway 39
 Highway 85

Adjacent counties
Lee County (north)
Tunica County, Mississippi (northeast)
Coahoma County, Mississippi (east)
Bolivar County, Mississippi (southeast)
Desha County (south)
Arkansas County (southwest)
Monroe County (northwest)

National protected areas
 St. Francis National Forest (part)
 White River National Wildlife Refuge (part)

Demographics

2020 census

As of the 2020 United States Census, there were 16,568 people, 7,485 households, and 4,836 families residing in the county.

2010 census
As of the 2010 census, there were 21,757 people living in the county. 63.1% were Black or African American, 35.0% White, 0.3% Asian, 0.2% Native American, 0.4% of some other race and 0.9% of two or more races. 1.3% were Hispanic or Latino (of any race).

2000 census
As of the 2000 census, there were 26,445 people, 9,711 households, and 6,768 families living in the county.  The population density was 38 people per square mile (15/km2).  There were 10,859 housing units at an average density of 16 per square mile (6/km2).  The racial makeup of the county was 59.04% Black or African American, 39.25% White, 0.43% from other races,  0.32% Asian, 0.17% Native American, 0.01% Pacific Islander, and 0.78% from two or more races.  1.44% of the population were Hispanic or Latino of any race. At over 58% of the county's population, Phillips County has the highest percentage of African Americans in the state of Arkansas.

There were 9,711 households, out of which 34.20% had children under the age of 18 living with them, 40.30% were married couples living together, 25.10% had a female householder with no husband present, and 30.30% were non-families. 27.60% of all households were made up of individuals, and 13.00% had someone living alone who was 65 years of age or older.  The average household size was 2.69 and the average family size was 3.29.

In the county, the population was spread out, with 32.20% under the age of 18, 9.40% from 18 to 24, 23.20% from 25 to 44, 21.20% from 45 to 64, and 13.90% who were 65 years of age or older. The median age was 33 years. For every 100 females there were 84.70 males.  For every 100 females age 18 and over, there were 77.70 males.

The median income for a household in the county was $22,231, and the median income for a family was $26,570. Males had a median income of $24,675 versus $17,520 for females. The per capita income for the county was $12,288.  About 28.70% of families and 32.70% of the population were below the poverty line, including 45.50% of those under age 18 and 26.20% of those age 65 or over.

For the period 2000–2009, the Helena-West Helena statistical area lost 20.89% of its population, the largest decline of any statistical area in the country.

Government
As a majority-black county, Phillips County is strongly Democratic. It has voted for the Democratic presidential candidate in all but two elections in the last century. Strom Thurmond carried the county in his whites-only Dixiecrat effort in 1948. At that time, Democrats were composed chiefly of conservative whites, as most blacks had been disenfranchised at the turn of the century. Prior to that, they had been affiliated with the Republican Party. 

Richard Nixon carried the county in his 1972 landslide. Blacks were not yet voting in full force, following passage of the Voting Rights Act of 1965, as some states and counties continued to have ways to suppress their vote.

Education
School districts serving Phillips County include the Helena-West Helena School District, the Marvell–Elaine School District, and the Barton–Lexa School District.

Previously the Lake View School District served a portion of the county. On July 1, 2004, the Lake View district merged into the Barton–Lexa district. Previously the Elaine School District served another portion of the county. On July 1, 2006, the Elaine district merged into the Marvell district.

Marvell Academy, a private school founded in 1966 as a segregation academy, is in unincorporated Phillips County, near Marvell.

Communities

Cities
Elaine
Helena–West Helena (county seat)
Lake View
Marvell

Town
Lexa

Unincorporated places
Modoc
Poplar Grove
Lambrook

Townships

Notable people
Bruce Bennett, Arkansas Attorney General
Barry Williamson, attorney and member of the Texas Railroad Commission
Blanche Lincoln, U.S. Senator
Mark Lavon "Levon" Helm, drummer and singer for The Band
Robert Lockwood Jr., blues guitarist and singer
Angie Craig, U.S. Representative from Minnesota

See also

 List of lakes in Phillips County, Arkansas
 National Register of Historic Places listings in Phillips County, Arkansas

References

External links
 Phillips County, Arkansas entry on the Encyclopedia of Arkansas History & Culture

 
1820 establishments in Arkansas Territory
Populated places established in 1820
Arkansas counties on the Mississippi River
Black Belt (U.S. region)
Majority-minority counties in Arkansas